Romanèchite is the primary constituent of psilomelane, which is a mixture of minerals. Most psilomelane is not pure romanechite, so it is incorrect to consider them synonyms. Romanèchite is a valuable ore of manganese, which is used in steelmaking and sodium battery production. It has a monoclinic crystal structure, a hardness of 6 and a specific gravity of 4.7-5. Romanèchite's structure consists of 2 × 3 tunnels formed by Mn oxide octahedra.

It is associated with hematite, barite, pyrolusite, quartz and other manganese oxide minerals. It has been found in France, Germany, England, Brazil, India, and various parts of the United States, including Arizona, Virginia, Tennessee and Michigan, and sites throughout the Appalachian Valley and Ridge.

References 

Barium minerals
Manganese(III,IV) minerals
Oxide minerals
Monoclinic minerals
Minerals in space group 12